Yeşilvadi can refer to:

 Yeşilvadi, Aziziye
 Yeşilvadi, Gerede
 Yeşilvadi, Serik